Father Brown is a British television series, which originally aired on ITV in 1974. It featured Kenneth More as Father Brown, a Roman Catholic priest who solved crime mysteries. The episodes were closely based on the stories by G. K. Chesterton.

Main cast
 Kenneth More as Father Brown 
 Dennis Burgess as Hercule Flambeau

Production
Portions of the series were shot in St. Clements Caves in Hastings, Sussex, England.

Episodes

References

External links

 

Adaptations of works by G. K. Chesterton
1970s British drama television series
ITV television dramas
1974 British television series debuts
ITV crime dramas
ITV mystery shows
Television shows produced by Associated Television (ATV)
English-language television shows
1970s British crime television series
1970s British mystery television series
Catholic drama television series
Television shows shot at ATV Elstree Studios